The 2016 Princeton Tigers football team represented Princeton University in the 2016 NCAA Division I FCS football season. They were led by seventh-year head coach Bob Surace and played their home games at Powers Field at Princeton Stadium. Princeton is a member of the Ivy League. They finished the season 8–2 overall and 6–1 in Ivy League play to tie with Penn for the Ivy League title, their first since 2013. Princeton averaged 8,990 fans per game.

Schedule

Game summaries

Lafayette

at Lehigh

at Columbia

at Georgetown

Brown

Harvard

at Cornell

Penn

at Yale

Dartmouth

References

Princeton
Princeton Tigers football seasons
Ivy League football champion seasons
Princeton Tigers football